The German term  (pl. ) is a pejorative approximately meaning "unconstitutional, unjust, or unlawful state" used to refer to a state in which the exercise of major aspects of governmental power is not constrained by the law, as opposed to a  (constitutional state). It is used not only as a jurisprudential term but also as a political one. The origin of the term is attributed to the Prussian Catholic politician Peter Reichensperger, who in 1853 used the term to imply that Prussia would become "unjust" if it curtailed the rights of its Catholic subjects.

States that have been referred to as an  include:
 The German Democratic Republic
 The Republic of Belarus
 The People's Republic of China
 The Democratic People's Republic of Korea
 The Republic of the Union of Myanmar
 The Russian Federation
 Apartheid-era South Africa
 The Union of Soviet Socialist Republics

Connotations 
In contrast with historical  (non-),  have the capacity to be  after a period of historical development.

Scholars who view it as such maintain that it is an accurate designation because the state was not based on the rule of law and was unjust.

A common example of this is Nazi Germany during World War II and the Holocaust. However, some have criticized this argument as flawed, citing the fact that the Weimar Constitution technically remained in effect throughout the Nazi era from 1933 to 1945, and that Hitler used it to give his dictatorship the appearance of legality, holding three Reichstag elections during his rule, as proof.

References

Political terminology in Germany
Philosophy of law
Theories of law
German words and phrases